This is a list of conflicts in Mexico arranged chronologically from the pre-Columbian era until postcolonial period ( – ). This list includes any raid, strike, skirmish, siege, sacking, and/or battle (both land and naval) that occurred on the territories of what may today be referred to as Mexico; however, in which the conflict itself may have only been part of an operation of a campaign in a theater of a greater war (e.g. any and/or all border, undeclared, colonial, proxy, liberation, Indian wars, world wars, etc.). There may also be periods of violent, civil unrest listed; such as, shootouts, spree killings, massacres, terrorist attacks, coups, assassinations, regicides, riots, rebellions, revolutions, and civil wars (as well as wars of succession and/or independence). The list might also contain episodes of human sacrifice, mass suicide, and ethnic cleansing/genocide.

Pre-Columbian era (c. 10000 BCE – c. 1521 CE)

Preclassic stage (c. 1000 BCE – c. 500 CE)

Late Preclassic period (c. 400 BCE – c. 500 CE)

Terminal Preclassic division (c. 159 – c. 500 CE)

Teotihuacan civilization (c. 300 BCE – c. 547 CE)

Campaigns of Spearthrower Owl ( CE)
Conquest of Tikal (378 CE)
Conquest of Copán (426 CE)
Conquest of Quiriguá (426 CE)
Fall of Teotihuacan ( CE)

Maya civilization (c. 1000 BCE – c. 1697 CE)

Wars of the Mayans
Campaigns of K'inich Tatb'u Skull I ( CE)
Conquest of Bonampak
Campaigns of Yuknoom Chʼeen I

Classic stage (c. 500 – c. 1200 CE)

Early Classic period (c. 500 – c. 600 CE)

Maya civilization (c. 1000 BCE – c. 1697 CE) 

Wars of the Mayans
Campaigns of Tuun Kʼabʼ Hix
Campaigns of Itzamnaaj Bahlam II
War against Ah Ahaual
Campaigns of Yohl Ikʼnal
Palenque–Calakmul war (599–611 CE)
Sack of Palenque (599 CE)

Late Classic period (c. 600 – c. 800 CE)

Maya civilization (c. 1000 BCE – c. 1697 CE) 

Wars of the Mayans
Campaigns of Sky Witness
Tikal–Calakmul wars (537–838 CE)
First Tikal–Calakmul War (537–572 CE)
Star wars (562–781 CE)
Tikal–Calakmul star war (562 CE)
Campaigns of Scroll Serpent
Calakmul–Palenque war (599 CE)
Campaigns of Yuknoom Head
Star wars (562–781 CE)
Calakmul–Naranjo star war (631 CE)
Campaigns of K'ahk' Xiiw Chan Chaahk
Star wars (562–781 CE)
Naranjo–Caracol war (636 CE)
Campaigns of Bahlam Ajaw
Star wars (562–781 CE)
Tortuguero star war (644 CE)
Conquest of Comalcalco (649 CE)
Campaigns of Yuknoom Chʼeen II
Tikal–Calakmul wars (537–838 CE)
Second Tikal–Calakmul War (650–695 CE)
Defeat of Calakmul (695 CE)
Star wars (562–781 CE)
Tikal–Calakmul star war (657 CE)
Campaigns of Yaxun Bʼalam III
Conquest of Hix Witz ( CE)
Campaigns of Itzamnaaj Bahlam III
War against Ah Ahaual ( CE)
Campaigns of Kʼakʼ Tiliw Chan Chaak
Defeat of Ucanal (695 CE)
Sack of Yaxha (710 CE)
Campaigns of K'inich B'aaknal Chaak
Star wars (562–781 CE)
Tonina–Palenque war (711 CE)
Campaigns of Wak Chanil Ajaw
Sack of K'inichil Kab (699 CE)
Sacking of nine unknown polities ( CE)
Victory against Komkom (726 CE)
Campaigns of Yax Mayuy Chan Chaak
Conquest of Komkom (726 CE)
Defeat by Tikal (744 CE)
War of succession ( CE)
Campaigns of Yaxun Bʼalam IV
Defeat of Yuknoom Tookʼ Kʼawiil
Tikal–Calakmul wars (537–838 CE)
Third Tikal–Calakmul War (720–744 CE)
Conquest of Calakmul (736 CE)

Terminal Classic period (c. 800 – c. 1000 CE)

Maya civilization (c. 1000 BCE – c. 1697 CE)
Wars of the Mayans
Classic Maya collapse ( CE)

Toltec civilization (c. 400 BCE – c. 1222 CE)

Toltec empire (c. 674 – c. 1179 CE)

Campaigns of Xochitl
Toltec civil war ( CE)
Campaigns of Ce Acatl Topiltzin
Toltec civil war ( CE)

Postclassic stage (c. 900 – c. 1519 CE)

Early Postclassic period (c. 900 – c. 1200 CE)

Mixtec civilization (c. 1250 BCE – c. 1550 CE)

Campaigns of Eight Deer Jaguar Claw
Conquest of Red and White Bundle
Execution of Eight Deer Jaguar Claw (1115 CE)
Campaigns of Atonal II
Defeated by the Aztecs
Conquest of Coixtlahuaca

Maya civilization (c. 1000 BCE – c. 1697 CE)

Wars of the Mayans
Classic Maya collapse ( CE)
Campaigns of Chac-Xib-Chac
Conquest of Chichen Itza
Fall of Mayapan ( CE)

Late Postclassic period (c. 1200 – c. 1519 CE)

Purépecha civilization (c. 1000 – 1530 CE)

Purépecha empire (c. 1300 – 1530 CE)

Campaigns of Tariácuri
Campaigns of Tangaxuan II
Saltpeter war (1480–1510 CE)

Zapotec civilization (c. 700 BCE – c. 1715 CE)

Wars of the Zapotecs
Campaigns of Cosijoeza ( CE)
Zapotec conquest of Tehuantepec (1487 CE)
Zapotec warfare and resistance against the Aztecs (1496–1497 CE)
Aztec siege of Tehuantepec (1496 CE)
Aztec destruction of Huaxyacac (1497 CE)
Aztec destruction of Mitla (1497 CE)
Aztec siege of Guiengola (1497 CE)

Aztec civilization (c. 1248 – 1521 CE)

Tepanec empire (c. 995–1428 CE)

Wars of the Tepanecs ( CE)
Conquest of Ayotoxco ( CE)
Conquest of Ocoyoacac ( CE)
Conquest of Coyoacán ( CE)
Conquest of Coatepec ( CE)
Conquest of Cuitláhuac ( CE)
Conquest of Cuauhtitlan ( CE)
Conquest of Azcapotzalco ( CE)
Conquest of Atotonilco ( CE)
Campaigns of Coxcoxtli ( CE)
Culhuacán-Mexica war ( CE)
Conquest of Coatlinchan ( CE)
Conquest of Tetzcoco ( CE)
Conquest of Cuajimalpa (1342 CE)
Conquest of Xochimilco ( CE)
Conquest of Chalco ( CE)
Conquest of Cuauhnahuac ( CE)
Campaigns of Tezozomoc
Azcapotzalco-Texcoco war ( CE)
Conquest of Tepotzotlán (1372 CE)
Conquest of Culhuacán ( CE)
Conquest of Xaltocan ( CE)
Campaigns of Maxtla
Rebellion in Azcapotzalco ( CE)
Tepanec War (1426–1440 CE)
Wars of the Aztecs ( CE)
Campaigns of Acamapichtli
Conquest of Chalco ( CE)
Conquest of Cuauhnahuac
Conquest of Xochimilco ( CE)
Campaigns of Huitzilihuitl
Conquest of Tollantzingo ( CE)
Conquest of Otompa ( CE)
Conquest of Acolman (1396 CE)
Conquest of Tultitlan ( CE)
Conquest of Xaltocan ( CE)

Aztec Empire (1428–1521 CE)

Wars of the Aztecs ( CE)
Tepanec War (1426–1440 CE)
Conquest of Teotihuacan (1427 CE)
Campaigns of Itzcoatl
Conquest of Coyoacán ( CE)
Conquest of Culhuacán ( CE)
Conquest of Mixquic (1432 CE)
Conquest of Cuitláhuac ( CE)
Conquest of Tezompa ( CE)
Conquest of Cuauhnahuac ( CE)
Conquest of Tenayuca ( CE)
Campaigns of Moctezuma I
Subjugation of the Huastec people ( CE)
Subjugation of the Totonac people ( CE)
Flower wars (1454–1519 CE)
Subjugation of the Mixtec people ( CE)
Conquest of Coixtlahuaca ( CE)
Conquest of Cosamaloapan ( CE)
Conquest of Āhuilizāpan ( CE)
Conquest of Cuauhtitlan ( CE)
Campaigns of Axayacatl
Battle of Tlatelolco (1473 CE)
Conquest of Tlatelolco (1473 CE)
Conquest of Cuetlachtlan (1474 CE)
Subjugation of the Matlatzinca people ( CE)
Conquest of Calixtlahuaca ( CE)
Conquest of Tollocan (1478 CE)
Campaigns of Moctezuma II
Conquest of Soconusco ( CE)
Conquest of Tehuantepec ( CE)
Subjugation of the Zapotec people ( CE)
Subjugation of the Yopi people ( CE)

Colonial period (1521–1821)

Spanish Golden Age (1492–1681)

Trastámaran dynasty (1479–1555)

Spanish conquest era (1521–1550)

European colonization of the Americas
Spanish colonization of the Americas
Spanish conquest of Mexico
Spanish conquest of the Maya
Spanish conquest of Yucatán ( – 1546)
Spanish conquest of Chiapas
Spanish conquest of the Aztec Empire (1519–1521)
Cholula massacre (1519)
Massacre in the Great Temple of Tenochtitlan (1520)
Battle of Cempoala (1520)
La Noche Triste (1520)
Battle of Otumba (1520)
Fall of Tenochtitlan (1521)
Battle of Colhuacatonco (1521)
Spanish conquest of the Tarascan empire (1522–1530)
Expedition of Francisco Vázquez de Coronado (1535–1554)
Conquest of Cíbola (1540)
Tiguex War (1540–1541)
Yaqui Wars (1533–1929)
Mixtón war (1540–1542)
Apache wars ( – 1924)
Apache–Mexico Wars ( – 1915)
Chichimeca war (1550–1590)

Habsburg dynasty (1555–1700)

Pax Hispanica (1598–1621)

European colonization of the Americas
Spanish colonization of the Americas
Spanish conquest of Mexico
Spanish conquest of the Maya
Spanish conquest of Chiapas
Spanish conquest of Petén
Yaqui Wars (1533–1929)
Apache Wars ( – 1924)
Apache–Mexico Wars ( – 1924)
Chichimeca war (1550–1590)
Acoma massacre (1599)
Acaxee Rebellion (1601–1607)
Tepehuán Revolt (1616–1620)
Navajo wars ( – 1864)
European wars of religion
Eighty Years' War (1568–1648)
Anglo-Spanish war (1585–1604)
Raid on Tabasco (1599)

Bourbon dynasty (1700–1808)

European colonization of the Americas
Spanish colonization of the Americas
Spanish conquest of Mexico
Spanish conquest of the Maya
Apache wars ( – 1924)
Apache–Mexico wars ( – 1924)
First Magdalena Massacre (1757)
Second Magdalena massacre (1776)
Navajo wars ( – 1864)
Tzeltal rebellion (1712)

Postcolonial period (1821 – Present)

Mexican independence era (1808–1829)

House of Bonaparte (1808–1813)

Spanish American wars of independence (1808–1833)
Mexican War of Independence (1810–1821)
First stage (1810–1811)
Battle of Monte de las Cruces (1810)
Battle of Calderón Bridge (1811)
Organizational phase (1810–1815)
Battle of El Veladero (1810–1811)
Battle of Puerto de Piñones (1811)
Battle of Zacatecas (1811)
Battle of El Maguey (1811)
Battle of Llanos de Santa Juana (1811)
Battle of Zitácuaro (1812)
Battle of Tecualoya (1812)
Battle of Tenancingo (1812)
Siege of Cuautla (1812)
Battle of Izúcar (1812)
Siege of Huajuapan de León (1812)
Battle of Tenango del Valle (1812)
Battle of Escamela (1812)
Battle of Zitlala (1812)
Capture of Orizaba (1812)
Capture of Oaxaca (1812)

House of Bourbon (1813–1820)

Spanish American wars of independence (1808–1833)
Mexican War of Independence (1810–1821)
Organizational phase (1811–1815)
Battle of Rosillo Creek (1813)
Siege of Acapulco (1813)
Battle of La Chincúa (1813)
Battle of Alazan Creek (1813)
Battle of Medina (1813)
Battle of Lomas de Santa María (1813)
Battle of Puruarán (1814)
Battle of Temalaca (1815)
Resistance and consummation phases (1815–1821)
Battle of Agua Zarca (1819)

House of Iturbide (1821–1823)

First Mexican Empire (1821–1823)

Spanish American wars of independence (1808–1833)
Mexican War of Independence (1810–1821)
Resistance and consummation phases (1815–1821)
Battle of Azcapotzalco (1821)

Revolt against the emperor (1822–1823)

Casa Mata Plan Revolution (1822–1823)
Battle of Almolonga (1823)

First Mexican Republic (1824–1835)

Provisional Government of Mexico (1823–1824)

Spaniards in Mexico (1821–1829)

Spanish attempts to reconquer Mexico (1821–1829)
Battle of Mariel (1828)

Revolts against the government (1823)
Rebellion of Oaxaca (1823)
Rebellion of Guadalajara (1823)
Rebellion of Puebla (1823)
Revolt of Querétaro (1823)

Age of Santa Anna (1829–1846)

Spanish attempts to reconquer Mexico (1821–1829)
Battle of Tampico (1829–1829)

Centralist Republic of Mexico (1835–1846)

Comanche conflict (1821–1846)

Comanche-Mexico Wars (1821–1870)

Armed opposition (1835–1840)

Mexican Federalist War (1835–1840)
Zacatecas rebellion (1835)
Battle of Zacatecas (1835)

Texas war for independence (1835–1836)

Mexican Federalist War (1835–1840)
Mexican conflicts with Texas (1835–1836)
Texas war for independence (1835–1836)
Battle of Gonzales (1835)
Battle of Goliad (1835)
Battle of Concepción (1835)
Grass Fight (1835)
Siege of Béxar (1835)
Battle of San Patricio (1836)
Battle of the Alamo (1836)
Battle of Agua Dulce (1836)
Battle of Refugio (1836)
Battle of Coleto (1836)
Battle of San Jacinto (1836)
Battle of Matamoros (1836)
Battle of Salado Creek (1842)
Texan Santa Fe Expedition (1841–1842)
Battle of Acajete (1839)
Siege of Tampico (1839)
Battle of Alcantra (1839)
Rebellion of the Republic of the Rio Grande
Battle of Santa Rita de Morelos (1840)
Battle of Saltillo (1840)
First Franco-Mexican War (1838–1839)
Battle of Veracruz (1838)
Mier expedition (1842–1843)
Naval Battle of Campeche (1843–1843)

Mexican–American War (1846)

Mexican–American War (1846–1848)
Northern Mexican Theater (1846–1848)
Battle of Monterrey (1846)
Mexico City Campaign (1846–1848)
Blockade of Veracruz (1846–1848)

Second Federal Republic of Mexico (1846–1863)

Mexican–American War (1846–1848)

Mexican–American War (1846–1848)
Northern Mexican Theater (1846–1848)
Battle of Buena Vista (1847)
Battle of the Sacramento River (1847)
Battle of Santa Cruz de Rosales (1848)
Mexico City Campaign (1846–1848)
Blockade of Veracruz (1846–1848)
Revolt of the Polkos (1847)
Siege of Veracruz (1847)
Battle of Cerro Gordo (1847)
Battle of Contreras (1847)
Battle of Churubusco (1847)
Battle for Mexico City (1847)
Battle of Molino del Rey (1847)
Battle of Chapultepec (1847)
Siege of Puebla (1847)
Battle of Huamantla (1847)
Action of Atlixco (1847)
Skirmish at Matamoros (1847)
Affair at Galaxara Pass (1847)
Action of Sequalteplan (1848)
Pacific Coast Campaign (1847–1848)
Battle of Mulegé (1847)
Bombardment of Guaymas (1847)
Bombardment of Punta Sombrero (1847)
Battle of La Paz (1847)
Battle of San José del Cabo (1847)
Siege of La Paz (1847)
Siege of San José del Cabo (1848)
Skirmish of Todos Santos (1848)

La Reforma (c. 1833 – c. 1867)

Zacatecas rebellion (1835)
Caste War of Yucatán (1847 – )

Santa Anna dictatorship (1853–1855)
Expedition of William Walker to Baja California and Sonora (1853–1854)

Alvarez Presidency (1855)

Revolution of Ayutla (1854–1855)

Juarez Presidency (1857–1872)

Cortina Troubles (1859–1861)
Battle of La Ebonal (1859)
Battle of Rio Grande City (1859)

Reform War (1857–1860)

Mexican Civil Wars ( – Present)
Reform War (1857—1860)
Crabb massacre (1857)
Battle of Celaya (1858)
Battle of Salamanca (1858)
Battle of Atenquique (1858)
Battle of La Albarrada (1858)
Battle of Ixtlahuaca (1858)
Battle of Ahualulco (1858)
Battle of Guadalajara (1858)
Battle of San Joaquín (1858)

Foreign intervention (1861–1863)

Second Franco-Mexican War (1861–1867)
Battle of Fortín (1862)
Battle of Las Cumbres (1862)
Battle of Atlixco (1862)
Battle of Puebla (1862)
Battle of Acapulco (1863)

Second Mexican Empire (1864–1867)

Second Franco-Mexican War (1861–1867)
Battle of San Juan Bautista (1864)
Capture of Mazatlán (1864)
Capture of Monterrey (1864)
Battle of San Pedro (1864)
Battle of la Loma (1865)
Capture of Chihuahua (1865)
Battle of Miahuatlán (1866)
Battle of La Carbonera (1866)
Battle of Guayabo (1866)
Third Battle of Puebla (1867)
Siege of Querétaro (1867)
Siege of Mexico City (1867)

Restored Republic (1867–1876)

Las Cuevas War (1875)
Battle of Tecoac (1876)

Contemporary Mexico (1876 – Present)

Porfiriato (1876–1911)

Spanish colonization of the Americas ( CE)
Mexican-Indian Wars ( CE – )
Yaqui Wars (1533–1929)
Yaqui Uprising (1896)
Battle of Mazocoba (1900)
Apache Wars ( – 1924 CE)
Apache–Mexico Wars ( – 1924)
Post-1887 Apache Wars period (1887–1924)
Apache campaign (1896)
Victorio's War (1879–1880)
Geronimo's War (1886–1887)
Crawford affair (1886)
Garza Revolution (1891–1893)

Revolutionary Mexico (1911–1928)

Madero presidency (1911–1913)

Mexican Revolution (1910–1921)
Magonista campaign in Baja California (1911)
Capture of Mexicali (1911)
First Battle of Tijuana (1911)
Second Battle of Tijuana (1911)
Battle of Casas Grandes (1911)
First Battle of Agua Prieta (1911)
Battle of Cuautla (1911)
First Battle of Rellano (1912)
Second Battle of Rellano (1912)

Counter-revolution and civil war (1913–1915)
Mexican Revolution (1910–1921)
Naval operations of the Mexican Revolution (1914)
First Battle of Topolobampo (1914)
Second Battle of Topolobampo (1914)
Third Battle of Topolobampo (1914)
Action of 9 April 1914
Fourth Battle of Topolobampo (1914)
Ten Tragic Days (1913)
First Battle of Nogales (1913)
Battle of Naco (1913)
First Battle of Torreón (1913)
Second Battle of Ciudad Juárez (1913)
Battle of Tierra Blanca (1913)
Battle of Ojinaga (1914)
Second Battle of Torreón (1914)
Battle of Zacatecas (1914)

Constitutionalists in power (1915–1920)
Mexican Revolution (1910–1921)
Battle of Celaya (1915)
Second Battle of Agua Prieta (1915)
Third Battle of Torreón (1916)
Third Battle of Ciudad Juarez (1919)
First World War (1914–1918)
Banana Wars (1898–1934)
Mexican–American wars
Rio Grande border disputes
Río Rico
Chamizal dispute
Country Club Dispute
Ojinaga Cut
United States involvement in the Mexican Revolution (1910–1919)
Tampico Affair (1914)
Ypiranga incident (1914)
Mexican Border War (1910–1919)
First Battle of Agua Prieta (1911)
First Battle of Ciudad Juárez (1911)
Second Battle of Nogales (1915)
United States occupation of Veracruz (1914)
Pancho Villa Expedition (1916–1917)
Battle of Parral (1916)
Battle of Carrizal (1916)
Zimmermann Telegram (1917)
Battle of Ambos Nogales (1918)

Calles presidency (1924–1928)

Cristero War (1926–1929)
Battle of San Julián (1927)

Maximato (1928–1934)

Mexico under the PNR (1929–1988)

Mexico under the PNR (1929–1938)
Cristero War (1926–1929)
Battle of Tepatitlán (1929)
Escobar Rebellion (1929)
Siege of Naco (1929)
Bombing of Naco (1929)
Johnson's Ranch Raid (1929)

Mexico under the PRM (1938–1946)

Camacho presidency (1940–1946)

Second World War (1939–1945)
Sinking of SS Faja de Oro (1942)

Mexico under the PRI (1946–1988)

Mexico–Guatemala conflict (1958–1959)
Cold War (1947–1991)
Mexican Dirty War (1959–2000)
Protests of 1968 (1968–1969)
Mexican Movement (1968–1968)
Tlatelolco massacre (1968)
El Halconazo (1971)

Chiapas conflict (1994 – Present)

Chiapas conflict (1994 – )
Zapatista Uprising (1994–2006)
Zapatista uprising (1994)
Zapatista crisis (1995)
The Other Campaign (2005–2006)
Acteal massacre (1997)

Mexican drug war (2006 – Present)

War on drugs (1969 – )
Mexican drug war (2006 – )
Operation Michoacán (2006 – )
Operation Baja California (2007 – )
Joint Operation Nuevo León-Tamaulipas (2007 – )
Nuevo León mass graves (2010)
San Fernando massacre (2010)
Shootout at Matamoros (2010)
San Fernando massacre (2011)
Monterrey casino attack (2011)
Operation Sinaloa (2008 – )
Operation Chihuahua (2008 – )
Operation Quintana Roo (2009 – )
Coahuila mass graves (2011)
Operación Lince Norte (2011)
Operación Escorpión (2011)
Mexican Indignados Movement (2011 – )
Mexican protests (2017)

References

Wars involving Mexico
Mexico
History of Mexico
Wars
Lists of events in Mexico
History of South America